Hanover Mountain is a mountain located in the Catskill Mountains of New York west of West Shokan. Little Rocky is located south, and Balsam Cap is located northwest of Hanover Mountain.

References

Mountains of Ulster County, New York
Mountains of New York (state)